Silver City is a 1951 American Western film directed by Byron Haskin and starring Edmond O'Brien, Yvonne De Carlo, and Barry Fitzgerald.

It was adapted from the 1947 novel High Vermilion by Luke Short, and was released under that title in the UK.

Plot
When the mining office of Charlie Storrs is robbed by two bandits, his right-hand man Larkin Moffatt gives chase. Larkin catches up to the riders, but then rides off, never to return. A furious Charlie fires him and spreads the word that Larkin is not a man to be trusted. Another very interested party is Josephine Storrs, who once was Larkin's woman but has recently married Charlie instead.

In the town of Silver City, where he is not known, Larkin settles down and opens a mining assayer's office. Candace Surrency is pleased when Larkin confirms the value of the ore sample she brought him, but distressed because her dad, Dutch, is leasing the mine and has just 12 days to get while he can before mineral rights revert to the already rich and wealthy RR Jarboe.

Candace's foreman is beaten by a henchman of Jarboe's. She tries to get Larkin to work for her, but he declines.

Into town ride Charlie and Jo, curious about Silver City mining opportunities. They are shocked to find Larkin there. It soon becomes clear that Jo only married Charlie for his money, not for love.

Charlie helps turn Jarboe against Larkin.

Jarboe's men sabotage the mine. Candace continues to plead for Larkin's help, but he resists. He does explain that he indeed was in on the robbery, planning it as a way to get more money for the greedy Jo, until a guilty conscience led him to leave for good, not spending the stolen loot.

In a final gunfight, Larkin is able to shoot two of Jarboe's henchmen. The only casualty is Candace's father, Dutch. As soon as the law can restore order, Larkin intends to see if he and Candace can become business partners and more.

Cast

Production
The film was based on the 1947 novel High Vermillion. (This was reprinted in 1949 as Hands Off.)

In February 1951 film rights were bought by producer Nat Holt who hired Frank Gruber to do a script.

The title was changed to Silver City and Edmond O'Brien was signed to star.

Rhonda Fleming was originally announced as O'Brien's costar. However by late March 1951, Yvonne de Carlo signed to play the female lead. "It's a very real, believable character," she said. Her fee by this stage was $50,000 a film.

Filming started on 30 April 1951 by which stage the title had been changed to Silver City.

De Carlo later made another film for Holt at Paramount, Hurricane Smith (1952).

Reception
The Los Angeles Times said the storyline was occasionally "baffling" but the film was full of "heaps of novel and exciting incidents".

References

External links
 
 
 
Silver City at Letterbox DVD

1951 films
1951 Western (genre) films
American Western (genre) films
Films based on Western (genre) novels
Films directed by Byron Haskin
Paramount Pictures films
Films scored by Paul Sawtell
1950s English-language films
1950s American films